Khang Bonar (also Romanized as Khang Bonār) is a village in Emamzadeh Jafar Rural District in the Central District of Gachsaran County, Kohgiluyeh and Boyer-Ahmad Province, Iran. In the 2006 census its population was 17 people spread across 5 families.

References 

Populated places in Gachsaran County